The Mandemakers Stadion is a multi-use stadium in Waalwijk, Netherlands.  It is currently used mostly for football matches. The stadium is able to hold 7,500 people and was built in 1996.

The Manademakers Stadion replaced the Sportpark Olympia stadium that was able to hold 6,200 people and opened in 1940. Sportpark Olympia is the name of the multi-use sports park in which the Mandemakers Stadion is located. Derde Klasse-side VV Baardwijk is one of many clubs in the sports park.

References

Football venues in the Netherlands
American football venues in the Netherlands
Sports venues in North Brabant
Sport in Waalwijk
RKC Waalwijk